Admiral Robert Leonard Groome CVO (10 September 1848 – 22 November 1917) was a Royal Navy officer who became Commander-in-Chief of the South East Coast of America Station.

Naval career
Promoted to captain on 4 August 1890, Groome became commanding officer of the cruiser HMS Tribune in July 1893, of the protected cruiser HMS Aeolus in January 1894 and of the protected cruiser HMS Terrible in June 1897. He went on to be commanding officer of the battleship HMS Repulse in December 1897, of the cruiser HMS Flora in June 1899 and of the protected cruiser HMS Cambrian in May 1901. After that he became Commander-in-Chief of the South East Coast of America Station in June 1899, Rear-Admiral, Portsmouth Division in January 1905 and Rear-Admiral, Channel Fleet in November 1905. He served as Director of Transports at the Admiralty from November 1907 to December 1911 holding the rank of vice-admiral.

References

Royal Navy admirals
1848 births
1917 deaths
Commanders of the Royal Victorian Order